Bükdeğirmeni is a village in Silifke district of Mersin Province, Turkey. It is situated to the east of Göksu River. The population of Bükdeğirmeni is 360 as of 2011. The population is composed of two different stocks. The ancestors of most people are from the now-abandoned nearby village of Multay and they may be of Mongol origin from the 14th century. The ancestors of the second group are animal breeders from Anamur. Major economic activities are farming and animal breeding.

References

Villages in Silifke District